Robert McInnes McKay (2 September 1900 – 24 May 1977) was a Scottish football player and manager. He played for Morton, Rangers, Newcastle United, Sunderland, Charlton Athletic, Bristol Rovers and Newport County, and represented Scotland once. After retiring as a player, McKay managed Dundee United and Ballymena United.

Career
McKay was a member of Morton's 1922 Scottish Cup-winning team in his first season as a professional before playing for Rangers. In November 1926, he signed for Newcastle United in a £2,750 deal, where he won the League championship that season, scoring a hat-trick on his debut. Two years later he transferred to Sunderland, moving between the Tyne–Wear derby clubs in an exchange deal with defender Bob Thomson. McKay won one Scotland cap in 1927 during his time with Newcastle. 

McKay took his first steps into management with Dundee United in July 1939 but managed only four League matches before the outbreak of war caused the suspension of the competition in September 1939. When it was decided to abandon the League programme, McKay's contract was terminated and he left the club, just three months after arriving.

Honours
Greenock Morton
 Scottish Cup: 1920–21

Newcastle United
 Football League: 1926–27

References

Sources

1900 births
1977 deaths
Footballers from Glasgow
Scottish footballers
Association football inside forwards
Scotland international footballers
Greenock Morton F.C. players
Rangers F.C. players
Newcastle United F.C. players
Bristol Rovers F.C. players
Newport County A.F.C. players
Ballymena United F.C. managers
Sunderland A.F.C. players
Charlton Athletic F.C. players
Scottish Football League players
English Football League players
Scottish Football League representative players
Scottish football managers
Dundee United F.C. managers
Parkhead F.C. players
Scottish Football League managers
Scottish Junior Football Association players
Vale of Clyde F.C. players
Neilston Victoria F.C. players